Reine Church is a parish church of the Church of Norway in Moskenes Municipality in Nordland county, Norway.  It is located in the village of Reine. It is one of the two churches in the Moskenes parish which is part of the Lofoten prosti (deanery) in the Diocese of Sør-Hålogaland. The white, wooden church was built in a long church style in 1890 using plans drawn up by the architect Ole Scheistrøen. The church seats about 250 people. The church was consecrated on 9 January 1891 by Bishop Johannes Nilsson Skaar.

Media gallery

See also
List of churches in Sør-Hålogaland

References

Moskenes
Churches in Nordland
Wooden churches in Norway
19th-century Church of Norway church buildings
Churches completed in 1890
1890 establishments in Norway
Long churches in Norway